Relations have always been strong between Azerbaijan and Turkey, and are often described as "one nation, two states" by the ex-president of Azerbaijan Heydar Aliyev due to both being Turkic countries.

Turkey was one of the first countries to recognize Azerbaijan's independence on June 4, 1918 (Treaty of Batum) and the first to recognize Azerbaijan's restoration of independence from the Soviet Union in 1991. Since then, Turkey has been a staunch supporter of Azerbaijan in its efforts to consolidate its independence, preserve its territorial integrity and realize its economic potential arising from the rich natural resources of the Caspian Sea.

Nagorno-Karabakh conflict

A war between Azerbaijan and neighbouring Armenia broke out shortly after the parliament of Nagorno-Karabakh, an autonomous oblast in Azerbaijan, voted to unify the region with Armenia on February 20, 1988. The Armenian demand to unify Karabakh with Armenia, which proliferated in the late 1980s, began in a relatively peaceful manner; however, as the Soviet Union's disintegration neared, the dispute gradually grew into a violent conflict between the ethnic groups in Nagorno-Karabakh, resulting in ethnic cleansing by all sides. The declaration of secession from Azerbaijan was the final result of the territorial conflict regarding the land.

Following a UN Security Council resolution on April 6, 1993, calling for the immediate withdrawal of Armenian forces from the Azerbaijani district of Kelbajar, Turkey joined Azerbaijan in imposing the full economic embargo on Armenia, and the border between the two states was closed. The border subsequently remained closed, as Turkey demanded the withdrawal of Armenia from Nagorno-Karabakh and seven surrounding districts of Azerbaijan. Turkey made the demand a condition for establishing diplomatic relations with Armenia.

Turkey supported Azerbaijan politically, supplied arms, and held joint military drills to improve combat interoperability since the 2020 Nagorno-Karabakh War. In September 2022 at a United Nations news conference, Turkish Defense Minister Hulusi Akar reiterated Turkey's support for Azerbaijan in its conflict with Armenia.

Negotiations and economic co-operation

Turkey supports the OSCE Minsk Group, as a mechanism for resolving the territorial dispute and views it from the principle of Azerbaijani integrity. It does not recognize the de facto independent republic of Nagorno-Karabakh that emerged, otherwise known as Artsakh. Turkey has supported various indirect bilateral talks between Azerbaijan and Armenia and initiated trilateral dialogue in Reykjavik in 2002 and the Istanbul Summit, 2004 among the Ministers of Foreign Affairs of Turkey, Azerbaijan, and Armenia in an attempt to resolve the ongoing conflict, but its diplomatic efforts are hampered by its own tensions with Armenia over the claim of Armenian genocide and its ongoing border blockade against Armenia, which has resulted in subsequent infrastructure projects bypassing Armenian territory.

Azerbaijan and Turkey have subsequently built upon their linguistic and cultural ties to form a very close economic partnership that sees Turkey negotiating to buy natural gas from Azerbaijan and the two co-operating, along with neighbouring Georgia, in such infrastructure projects as the Baku–Tbilisi–Ceyhan pipeline, the South Caucasus Pipeline, Kars-Tbilisi-Baku railway and the proposed Trans-Anatolian gas pipeline all of which bypassing Armenia despite a recent thawing in diplomatic relations between Ankara and Yerevan, which make them key players in European energy security. As BBC correspondent Chris Morris states, in The New Turkey (Granta Books, 2005), "Turkey lacks the great natural resources of the industrial age – oil and gas – and it has to import nearly all its energy supplies. But its proximity to Azerbaijan, the Caspian, and Central Asia, as well as to the Middle East, has allowed it to cultivate a new strategic role: the ‘missing link’ in a chain connecting these new producers of vast mineral resources with the consumer societies in Europe, America and beyond."

İlham Aliyev visited Turkey in 2003 shortly after first entering the Azerbaijani political scene at the behest of his ailing father Heydar Aliyev in a move that was interpreted at the time as an indication of political support from Turkish Prime Minister Recep Tayyip Erdoğan.

STAR 
The opening of the STAR oil refinery, owned by the Azerbaijani State Oil Company SOCAR, was held in the Turkish city of Izmir on October 19, 2018. The foundation of STAR was laid on October 25, 2011, with the participation of Azerbaijani and Turkish Presidents Ilham Aliyev and Recep Tayyip Erdogan. The consortium consisting of Técnicas Reunidas (Spain), Saipem (Italy), GS Engineering & Construction Corp (South Korea) and Itochu (Japan) built the plant.

TANAP 
The TANAP project was envisaged on November 17, 2011, at the Third Black Sea Energy and Economic Forum in Istanbul. The Memorandum of Understanding was signed between Azerbaijan and Turkey on the Trans Anatolian Gas Pipeline Project on December 24, 2011, in order to establish a consortium of the project with 20% (twenty percent) in accordance with the share of Turkey and 80% (eighty percent) in accordance with the share of the Republic of Azerbaijan.

Recep Tayyip Erdogan, Ilham Aliyev, and Georgy Margvelashvili officially met in the city of Kars in Eastern Turkey to lay the foundation of the pipeline on March 17, 2015. The construction of the gas pipeline began in 2015 and completed in June 2018.

On November 21, 2018, the Trans-Anatolian Gas Pipeline (TANAP) joined the Trans-Adriatic Pipeline (TAP) at the Turkish-Greek border near Meric River. Through the TAP, the Azerbaijani gas will be transported to Europe from the Shah Deniz field.

Military co-operation
Military co-operation between Azerbaijan and Turkey first emerged in 1992, with an agreement signed between the Azerbaijani and Turkish governments on military education and weapon equipment and deals to help strengthen the bond between the two nations. Since then, the Azerbaijani and the Turkish governments have closely cooperated on defense and security. The Training and Education Center of the Armed Forces was established in accordance with the protocol which was signed between Azerbaijan and the Turkish Armed Forces on 5 April 2000.

In June 2010, Azerbaijani military company Azersimtel announced that it had reached an agreement with the Turkish Mechanical and Chemical Industry Corporation (MKE) on launching a joint military facility. According to Turkish Defense Minister Vecdi Gonul, Turkish military assistance to Azerbaijan has exceeded $200 million in 2010. In the first stage of production, the company is expected to produce military arms venture for the Azerbaijani Armed Forces.

In December 2010, both countries signed a range of treaties that makes each other a guarantor in case of an attack by foreign forces. The Treaty would enter into force upon the exchange of instruments of ratification and valid for 10 years. In addition, the term extended for another 10 years if in the last 6 months, there is no notification to terminate the treaty.

More than 20 Turkish defense industry companies have co-operative and commercial relations with Azerbaijan.

On January 29, 2013, TAKM (Organization of the Eurasian Law Enforcement Agencies with Military Status) was formed as an intergovernmental military law enforcement (gendarmerie) organization of three Turkic countries (Azerbaijan, Kyrgyzstan and Turkey) and Mongolia.

Nakhchivan Military Base
The Azerbaijani military doctrine adopted in 2010 allows for foreign military bases in Azerbaijan, and that action opened the way to speculation that Turkey could quarter its troops in the Nakhchivan region, an Azerbaijani exclave surrounded by Armenia and Turkey. Azerbaijan maintains a base in Nakhchivan that has received heavy Turkish support in the past, but no official information is available about the current scope of military cooperation between the two countries in the exclave.

Recent relations

Armenian–Turkish diplomatic progress
On the eve of the April 2009 official visit to Turkey by US President Barack Obama, sources in Ankara and Yerevan announced that a deal may soon be struck to reopen the border between the two states and exchange diplomatic personnel.

That prompted concerns from both Baku and Turkish nationalists that the ongoing negotiations over the Nagorno-Karabakh dispute would be adversely affected by the lifting of the longstanding blockade. Azerbaijan Foreign Ministry spokesman Elkhan Polukhov initially stated that it was "too early" to discuss what steps his country might take in retaliation," Azerbaijani President İlham Aliyev failed to take part in the United Nations Alliance of Civilizations (UNAOC) meeting in Istanbul on April 6–7, which was claimed to be a protest. There was a speculation in the Turkish press that Azerbaijan had received distorted information on the content of the Armenian-Turkish talks through Russian channels. Further developments proved those claims to be groundless.

There was also heated debate in the Turkish Parliament with the Nationalist Movement Party (MHP) leader, Devlet Bahçeli, who shared the Azerbaijanis' "rightful concerns" in warning the government: "Your approach to Armenia harms our dignity". The Republican People's Party (CHP) leader, Deniz Baykal, asked, "How can we ignore the ongoing occupation of Azerbaijan?" Both parties were dispatching delegations to Baku and hosting Azerbaijani politicians in Ankara.

Turkish Prime Minister Recep Tayyip Erdoğan attempted to ease those concerns by announcing, "Unless Azerbaijan and Armenia sign a protocol on Nagorno-Karabakh, we will not sign any final agreement with Armenia on ties. We are doing preliminary work but this definitely depends on resolution of the Nagorno-Karabakh problem". Turkish Foreign Minister Ali Babacan clarified that "we want a solution in which everybody is a winner" in a statement prior to the April 15 Black Sea Economic Cooperation (BSEC) Foreign Ministers Council in Yerevan: "We don't say, 'Let's first solve one problem and solve the other later.' We want a similar process to start between Azerbaijan and Armenia. We are closely watching the talks between Azerbaijan and Armenia". Azerbaijani Foreign Minister Mahmud Mammad Guliev responded that the solution to both countries' problems should be tied to the solution of the dispute between Azerbaijan and Armenia and that Azerbaijanis believe that Turkey will protect their interests.

The International Crisis Group (ICG) issued a report on the normalisation: "The politicized debate whether to recognize as genocide the destruction of much of the Ottoman Armenian population and the stalemated Armenia-Azerbaijan conflict over Nagorno-Karabakh should not halt momentum. ... The unresolved Armenia-Azerbaijan conflict over Nagorno-Karabakh still risks undermining full adoption and implementation of the potential package deal between Turkey and Armenia. ... Bilateral détente with Armenia ultimately could help Baku recover territory better than the current stalemate".

Armenian-Turkish provisional roadmap
When the announcement of the provisional roadmap for normalising Armenia–Turkey relations was made on April 22, 2009, there was no mention of the dispute, which is no longer believed to be part of the agreement.

According to a statement from the office of Turkish President Abdullah Gül, he initiated a phone conversation with Aliyev following the announcement to stress the importance of "solidarity and cooperation" between their nations for regional stability, and speaking to the press on April 23, he reaffirmed commitment to finding a solution to the dispute: "There has been unprecedented intense diplomacy [that] does not only involve Turkey, Azerbaijan and Armenia [but also] Russia, the United States, the EU, are all involved.... If all these efforts produce a positive outcome, Turkey, Azerbaijan, Armenia and the entire region will benefit."

Azerbaijani Ambassador to Turkey Zakir Hashimov has confirmed that there is no crisis in his country's relations with Turkey following the announcement and welcomed the reassurances from Turkish President Gül and Prime Minister Erdoğan but expressed his state's position that the opening of the border between Turkey and Armenia would be unacceptable if unless Armenia evacuates five of the seven districts surrounding Nagorno-Karabakh (including the strategically important land corridor in Lachin) and subsequent discussions are agreed on for the evacuation of the remaining two and the eventual status of Nagorno-Karabakh itself.

Diplomatic tension
On April 25, 2009, reports quoted SOCAR President Rovnag Abdullayev as saying that the current deal for the supply of natural gas by Azerbaijan to Turkey was outdated and that talks on a new price deal were underway. Turkish Prime Minister Erdoğan responded, "I don't have information on that. However, if it [Azerbaijan] increased prices, then according to which facts did it do this? Such a rise in natural gas prices during a period of time when oil prices in the world are on the decline will, of course, be thought-provoking. These [facts] will be assessed and steps will be taken accordingly." When Turkish Energy Minister Hilmi Güler finally emerged from the talks, he stated, "These reports are not true; I have been holding meetings with the Azerbaijanis for two days. No such thing has been said; there is no rise. We have a contract, so they cannot do it."

On May 4, Azerbaijani Deputy Foreign Minister Arza Azimov traveled to Ankara to meet with the new Turkish Foreign Minister, Ahmet Davutoğlu, his first official engagement since taking office on May 2, and Foreign Ministry Undersecretary Ertuğrul Apakan for discussions reported to have been timed to ease diplomatic tensions and highlight the importance of bilateral relations.

On May 6, the new Turkish Energy Minister, Taner Yıldız, stated, "Energy will play the role of a catalyst in bringing the relations among Azerbaijan, Armenia and Turkey to a more positive level. ... There are no plans to delay the projects with Azerbaijan," as BOTAŞ President Saltuk Düzyol lead a delegation to Baku to discuss gas prices and future infrastructure projects and request an additional 8 billion m³ of Azerbaijani gas to meet Turkish domestic requirements.

Following a reportedly tense May 7 OSCE Minsk Group-mediated peace summit between Armenian President Sargsyan and Azerbaijani President Aliyev at the residence of the US Ambassador in Prague, on the sidelines of the EU's Eastern Partnership conference, which resulted in "no serious progress" Turkish President Gül met separately with the two leaders to propose four-way talks on the conflict to include Russia when they next met at the St. Petersburg Economic Forum in July.

Turkish Prime Minister Erdoğan confirmed during a live 9 May TRT broadcast that no problem exists in bilateral relations between Turkey and Azerbaijan and that the provisional roadmap with Armenia was tied to the resolution of the Nagorno-Karabakh conflict: "There is a causal link here. We closed the [border] gate. The reason was the occupation and the result was our closing the gate. If the reason disappears—then let's open the gate."

In a 24 February 2010 meeting with US Undersecretary of State William Burns, Azerbaijan's president Aliyev "made clear his distaste for [Turkey's] Erdogan government." Aliyev reportedly saw "naivete" in Turkish foreign policy, especially Turkey's "hostility to Israel." Aliyev also related his opposition to Turkish support for "Hamas and Gaza."

2009 Turkish prime ministerial visit to Baku
Turkish Prime Minister Erdoğan made a 13 May visit to Baku with a delegation that included Energy Minister Taner Yıldız, Foreign Minister Ahmet Davutoğlu, Foreign Trade Minister Zafer Çağlayan, Transportation Minister Binali Yıldrım and Culture and Tourism Minister Ertuğrul Günay to reaffirm the strained ties between the two countries.

In a press conference with Azerbaijani President Aliyev, Erdoğan reaffirmed, "There is a relation of cause and effect here. The occupation of Nagorno-Karabakh is the cause, and the closure of the border is the effect. Without the occupation ending, the gates will not be opened." Aliyev responded, "There could be no clearer answer than this. There is no doubt anymore." On the subject of gas prices, Erdoğan stated, "I cannot say that the price is fair. We will have talks to make sure the price is a fair one."

In a speech to the Azerbaijan Parliament in which he reaffirmed that Turkey and Azerbaijan were "one nation with two states," Erdoğan stated, "Some reports said Turkey gave up on Nagorno-Karabakh in order to normalize relations with Armenia. This is an outright lie. I dismiss it once again here. Our stance on Nagorno-Karabakh is clear, and there has never been any deviation from this stance. We want the problem to be resolved on the basis of the territorial integrity of Azerbaijan. We have never taken any steps that could harm the national interests of Azerbaijan and will never take such steps. There will be no normalization unless the occupation of Azerbaijani territory ends."

Turkish opposition parties responded positively to the visit with MHP Deputy Parliamentary Group Chairman Oktay Vural stating that, "The visit has been extremely positive because it reversed an erroneous policy."

Erdoğan flew on to Sochi, Russia, for a 16 May "working visit" with Russian Prime Minister Vladimir Putin at which he stated, "Turkey and Russia have responsibilities in the region. We have to take steps for the peace and well-being of the region. This includes the Nagorno-Karabakh problem, the Middle East dispute, the Cyprus problem." Putin responded, "Russia and Turkey seek for such problems to be resolved and will facilitate this in every way. ... As for difficult problems from the past – and the Karabakh problem is among such issues – a compromise should be found by the participants in the conflict. Other states which help reach a compromise in this aspect can play the role of mediators and guarantors to implement the signed agreements."

2009 Turkish foreign ministerial visit to Baku
Swiss Foreign Secretary Michael Ambühl updated Azerbaijani Foreign Minister Elmar Mammadyarov, on the ongoing Armenian–Turkish normalisation negotiations, at an 18 May meeting in Baku. Mammadyarov stated, "The latest developments showed that it was impossible to achieve progress in the maintenance of stability and security in the region without taking Azerbaijan's position into consideration and without a solution to the Nagorno-Karabakh conflict."

Turkish Foreign Minister Davutoğlu met with Mammadyarov on the sidelines of the Organisation of the Islamic Conference (OIC) Council of Foreign Ministers 23 May session in Damascus, with Davutoğlu subsequently announcing, "We will head to Baku together on board the same plane. This has turned out to be something like 'one state, two nations'; 'one nation, two delegations'. ... It is not possible to disagree with [Azerbaijani President] Aliyev's remarks concerning the performance of the Minsk Group. Because no progress has been made, it is now necessary to rescue this issue from being in the status of a frozen conflict. Turkey will continue its efforts."

Davutoğlu announced, at a 26 May joint press conference in Baku, "Turkey and Azerbaijan are not two ordinary friends, neighbours and brother countries, they are at the same time, two strategic partners. One of the fundamental foreign policy priorities which is embraced by everybody in Turkey – no matter what political thought [they] have – is the existing strategic partnership with Azerbaijan. ... Our message intended for actors in the region, particularly intended for Armenia, is very open and clear. The region should now be cleansed of occupation, stresses and high tension." Mammadyarov added, "We also discussed cooperation in the fields of energy, economy and culture. Our countries have signed around 150 documents in total, but we don't have to stop at what has been achieved."

Failure and cancellation of proposed Azerbaijan–Turkey visa-free regime

Azerbaijan agreed to a visa-free regime with Turkey while Iran also demanded the same visa-free regime with Azerbaijan. Iran had threatened to cut off the critical supply line between Azerbaijan and the Nakhchivan Autonomous Republic if Azerbaijan lifted visa requirements for Turkish citizens but not extend the same privilege to Iranian citizens. According to Azerbaijani diplomats, a visa-free travel regime proposed by Turkey in 2009 had fallen victim to Iranian pressure on Azerbaijan, prompting the last-minute cancellation of the deal between Baku and Ankara. Azerbaijani diplomats also said the national interests of Azerbaijan did not allow for an open-border policy with Iran since political instability in Iran may trigger a huge influx of Iranian ethnic Azeris refugees to Azerbaijan and did not want the proposed Turkey-Azerbaijan Visa-Free Regime to be reciprocal with Iran as well. Azerbaijan lifted visa requirements for Turkish citizens from 1 September 2019.

Strategic partnership
In June 2010, Azerbaijan and Turkey have signed key agreement on a package of Shah Deniz gas issues in Istanbul. The agreement also will open the way for securing supplies to the EU's flagship Nabucco gas pipeline project. On 16 September 2010, countries signed a treaty to establish Strategic Cooperation Council in Istanbul. In December 2010, National Assembly of Azerbaijan ratified on strategic partnership and mutual assistance between Azerbaijan and Turkey. The agreement consists of 23 articles and five chapters: Military-political and security issues, military and military-technical cooperation, humanitarian issues, economic cooperation, and common and final provisions.

The Ministry of Foreign Affairs stated in a written statement that the 2019 Turkish offensive into north-eastern Syria will serve to eliminate the terror risks, return of the refugees to their homes, solution of the humanitarian problems, and providing peace and stability within the territorial integrity of Syria.

Support in Turkey's tensions with Greece
Amid the tensions between Turkey and Greece in the Eastern Mediterranean which sparked in the summer of 2020, Azerbaijan's President Ilham Aliyev vowed to "stand with Turkey under any circumstances without any hesitation." Aliyev made these remarks while accepting the credentials of Greece's newly appointed ambassador to Azerbaijan, Nikolaos Piperigos, at an event in the capital Baku in September 2020. Aliyev said "we support Turkey on all issues, including the issue of intelligence in the Eastern Mediterranean."

Turkish President Recep Tayyip Erdogan said that Ankara will too continue to support Baku and that the friendship between the two countries is eternal.

Energy relations
As of August 2020, Azerbaijan has become Turkey's major gas supplier which fits into Turkey's efforts of the past several years to diminish its dependence on Russian gas.

Economic relations
On 11 September 2020, Turkish Trade Minister Ruhsar Pekcan said that Turkey aims to sign a Free Trade Agreement with Azerbaijan and increase trade turnover between the two countries. Noting that the trade turnover between the two countries in 2019 amounted to $4.4 billion, she said that this figure does not reflect the real potential of the two countries. Earlier in the year, on 25 February, Azerbaijan and Turkey signed the Preferential Trade Agreement that aims to step up efforts to bring their trade volume to $15bn.

High-level visits
On August 11, 2020, the Foreign Minister of Azerbaijan Jeyhun Bayramov paid his first visit to Turkey after being appointed for the position of Azerbaijan's new foreign minister.

Diplomacy

Republic of Azerbaijan
Ankara (Embassy) 
Iğdır (Consular Mission)
Istanbul (Consulate-General)
Kars (Consulate-General)

Republic of Turkey
Baku (Embassy)
Nakhcivan (Consulate-General)
Ganja (Consulate-General)

Embassies
The Embassy of Azerbaijan is located in Ankara, Turkey. The Embassy of Turkey is located in Baku, Azerbaijan.

See also

 
 Foreign relations of Azerbaijan 
 Foreign relations of Turkey
 Azerbaijan–Turkey border
 Azerbaijanis in Turkey
 Eurasianism
 Mustafa Kemal Atatürk Monument, Baku
 Organization of Turkic States
 Shusha Declaration
 Turanism
 Turks in Azerbaijan 
 Azerbaijan–European Union relations 
 Turkey–European Union relations

Notes

References

External links
 
 Military Relations of Azerbaijan and Turkey

 
Bilateral relations of Turkey
Turkey